The Faculty of Arts and Design (formerly known as the Escuela Nacional de Artes Plásticas or ENAP), is a college of art in Xochimilco, Mexico City. The school is part the Universidad Nacional Autónoma de México, and is responsible for teaching painting, sculpture and graphic design, with undergraduate and graduate studies in San Carlos.  It is regarded as one of the best art schools in Mexico.

History 
The Escuela Nacional de Artes Plásticas was spun off from the Academy of San Carlos.

The graduate program is held in San Carlos and is regarded as a research institute.

Notable alumni
Pedro Cervantes (born 1933), sculptor
Mónica Mayer (born 1954)
Gabriel Orozco (born 1962), attended 1981 to 1984.
Melchor Peredo (born 1927)
Puri Yáñez (born 1936), attended ENAP from 1956 to 1958.

See also

 Mexican art

References

External links 
Official Website (Spanish) Universidad Nacional Autónoma de México

Art schools in Mexico
National Autonomous University of Mexico